Penjerrick Garden -- often referred to as "Cornwall's true jungle garden"—lies between Budock Water and Mawnan Smith, near Falmouth, United Kingdom.

The founders planted the upper garden with specimens from abroad including rhododendrons, camellias, magnolias, azaleas, tree ferns and bamboos.  The garden is also home to the Penjerrick and Barclayi hybrid rhododendrons.  The skeleton of a brain coral brought to Penjerrick by Captain FitzRoy of the Beagle (that was Charles Darwin's expedition ship) can be found in the garden.

The lower part of Penjerrick is a dense valley garden reached by a wooden bridge.  In this wild, jungle-like setting are four ponds and countless tree ferns that date back almost to the original planting of the garden.  The tranquil garden (now owned by Rachel Morin) is at its best in April and May.

Images

References

External links 

 Official website
 Great British Gardens - Beautiful Gardens to visit and places to stay nearby
 Gardens in Cornwall

Gardens in Cornwall
Fox family of Falmouth